Raeed Muhammad Alam is a Pakistani actor, model, director and producer. 

He has appeared in several television serials such as Jo Tu Chahey, Mujhay Jeenay Do, Dil Ruba and Fitrat.

Early life
Raeed was born in Karachi on October 10th in 1988. 

He completed his MBA in marketing from Hamdard University.

Career

Modeling and acting
Raeed Mohammad Alam started his career from modeling in 2010. 

He first acted in a commercial of Sony Ericsson directed by Saqib Malik and then did many more commercials including National Food, Jazz, Pepsi, Djuice, Sprite and Rani Pulpy. 

Later he worked in several dramas including Badnaam, Kuch Na Kaho, Mujhay Jeenay Do, Jo Tu Chahey and Dil Ruba.

Direction and production
He worked as assistant with director Saqib Malik for seven years. 

He also directed two music videos Teri Yaad and one for Persian singer Shadi G. 

In 2018 he started his own production house called DNA Films.

Personal life
Raeed is married and has three kids.

Filmography

Television series

Telefilm

Film

References

External links
 
 
 

1988 births
Pakistani male television actors
Living people
21st-century Pakistani male actors
Pakistani male film actors